is a Japanese monthly shōnen manga magazine published by Kodansha, and first issued in May 2005. It is issued in perfect-bound B5 format and retails for 580 yen. The magazine also serializes manga through their Twi Siri Twitter account.

Current series

Twi Siri series

References

External links
  

2005 establishments in Japan
Monthly manga magazines published in Japan
Kodansha magazines
Magazines established in 2005
Shōnen manga magazines